Ridho Syuhada Putra (born 18 June 2004) is an Indonesian professional footballer who plays as a defensive midfielder for Liga 1 club PSIS Semarang.

Club career

PSIS Semarang
He was signed for PSIS Semarang to play in Liga 1 in the 2022 season. Ridho made his professional debut and scored a debut goal on 5 December 2022 in a match against Madura United at the Manahan Stadium, Surakarta.

Career statistics

Club

References

External links
 Ridho Syuhada at Soccerway

2004 births
Living people
Indonesian footballers
Association football midfielders
Liga 1 (Indonesia) players
PSIS Semarang players
Sportspeople from Riau